Wilfred Dent Turner (January 30, 1855 – November 8, 1933) was a lawyer, legislator, businessman, and the ninth Lieutenant Governor of North Carolina from 1901 to 1905, serving under Governor Charles B. Aycock.

Early life 
Wilfred Dent Turner was born in Iredell County, North Carolina on January 30, 1855. His grandfather, Samuel Turner moved to Iredell County from Port Tobacco, Maryland in 1818.  Wilfred's parents were Wilfred Turner (1809–1893) and Dorcas (Tomlinson) Turner (1813–1900).  The Turner family was the namesake of both the present day town of Turnersburg and Turnersburg township.  Wilfred attended Duke University, Class of 1876, and was a member of the Chi Phi Fraternity.  He died on November 8, 1933 and was buried in the Oakwood Cemetery in Statesville, North Carolina.

Wilfred was married three times:
 Ida Lanier (1857–1894), married in 1878; four children: Mrs. W. A. Colvert, Laura Lanier Turner, Mrs. James F. Robertson, and Jack Turner.
 Julie Harllee McCall (1867–1925), married in 1897; children: W. A. Turner and Dent Turner.
 Sarah F. Goff, married in 1927

Career 
A Democrat, Turner was elected to the North Carolina Senate in 1886, 1888 and 1890 from Iredell County. He was President pro tempore of the North Carolina Senate in 1891. Turner also served as the president of the Monbo Cotton Manufacturing Company.

Turner was also a delegate to the 1896 Democratic National Convention. He died at the age of 78 in 1933 after a short illness.

References 

 
 
 
 
 
 The Political Graveyard
 NC Manual of 1913

Lieutenant Governors of North Carolina
Democratic Party North Carolina state senators
Duke University alumni
People from Iredell County, North Carolina
1855 births
1933 deaths